Glengarry—Prescott—Russell (formerly known as Glengarry—Prescott) is a federal electoral district in Ontario, Canada, that has been represented in the House of Commons of Canada since 1953.

Geography
The district includes the United Counties of Prescott and Russell, the Township of North Glengarry and the former City of Cumberland (except for Orleans).

Major communities include Hawkesbury, Ottawa (part), Russell, Embrun, Casselman, East Hawkesbury, Alfred and Plantagenet, Champlain, Clarence-Rockland, North Glengarry and The Nation. Its area is 3,049 km2.

History
The district was created in 1952 as "Glengarry—Prescott" from parts of Glengarry and Prescott ridings. It consisted of Prescott County and Glengarry County.

In 1966, it was expanded to include Russell County excluding Cumberland Township. In 1970, the name was changed to "Glengarry—Prescott—Russell".

In 1976, the district was redefined to exclude Charlottenburgh Township and include Cumberland Township.

In 1987, it was redefined to consist of the United Counties of Prescott and Russell, the County of Glengarry and Akwesasne Indian Reserve No. 59 in the United Counties of Stormont, Dundas and Glengarry, and the part of the Township of Cumberland excluding the part north of Innes Road and west of Regional Road No. 57 and Trim Road.

In 1996, it was redefined to consist of the United Counties of Prescott and Russell, the County of Glengarry (excluding the Township of Charlottenburgh), the Township of Cumberland in the Regional Municipality of Ottawa-Carleton, excluding the part west of Trim Road and North of Innes Road.

In 2003, it was redefined to consist of the United Counties of Prescott and Russell, the Township of North Glengarry in the United Counties of Stormont, Dundas and Glengarry, and the part of the City of Ottawa east Cardinal Creek, Regional Road No. 174, Trim Road Wall Road, Mer Bleue Road and Boundary Road.

Following the 2012 redistribution of Canada's ridings, the riding will lose the Cardinal Creek and Carlsbad Springs area to Orléans.

Members of Parliament

This riding has elected the following Members of Parliament:

Election results

Glengarry—Prescott—Russell

				
				

Note: Conservative vote is compared to the total of the Canadian Alliance vote and Progressive Conservative vote in 2000 election.

		
Note: Canadian Alliance vote is compared to the Reform vote in 1997 election.

Glengarry—Prescott

Note: Ralliement créditiste vote is compared to Social Credit vote in 1963 election.

					

Note: NDP vote is compared to CCF vote in 1958 election.

Students Vote results

Glengarry—Prescott—Russell

References

Riding history for Glengarry—Prescott 1952-1970 from the Library of Parliament
Riding history for Glengarry—Prescott—Russell 1970-2008 from the Library of Parliament
2011 Results from Elections Canada

Notes

Ontario federal electoral districts
Clarence-Rockland
Federal electoral districts of Ottawa
Hawkesbury, Ontario
Russell, Ontario
1952 establishments in Ontario